David Rennie Hardman (18 October 1901 – 6 December 1989) was a British Labour Party politician.

Early life and education
Although he was born in London, David Hardman moved to Coleraine in Ireland with his parents when he was very young because his father (also David Hardman) was made head of Coleraine Technical Academy. He grew up in Coleraine with his sisters Grace  and Alice. 

David Hardman's education was interrupted by the First World War and it is understood he was called up when he was 17 on or after 18 October 1918. 

David deferred his place at Christ's College, Cambridge because of his military service, but, once at Cambridge he became the first Socialist President of the Cambridge Union in 1924. His parents had been members of the Fabian Society and he was an active socialist.

Political career
He unsuccessfully contested Cambridge at the 1929 general election.
At the 1945 general election, he was elected as Member of Parliament (MP) for Darlington, defeating the sitting Conservative MP Charles Peat.

Hardman held the seat until the 1951 general election, when he was defeated by the Conservative Fergus Graham. In the Clement Attlee's post-war Labour government, he was Parliamentary Secretary to the Minister of Education.

Death
He died on 6 December 1989 in Brighton, Sussex, England.

References

External links 
 

1901 births
1989 deaths
Labour Party (UK) MPs for English constituencies
Ministers in the Attlee governments, 1945–1951
Presidents of the Cambridge Union
UK MPs 1945–1950
UK MPs 1950–1951